Laatre is a village in Mulgi Parish, Viljandi County in southern Estonia. It's located in a pocket bordered by Latvia in the south, west and east, the only access to elsewhere Estonia is from the north. The town of Mõisaküla is located just northwest. Laatre has a population of 48 (as of 2011).

Laatre Manor (Moiseküll) was first mentioned in 1504. The name "Laatre" is derived from the Platers, the owners of the manor in the 17th century.

Writer August Kitzberg (1855–1927) was born in Laatre.

References

External links
Unofficial website 

Villages in Viljandi County
Estonia–Latvia border crossings